Manfield is a village and civil parish in North Yorkshire, England.

Manfield may also refer to:

People
Alice Manfield (1878-1960), mountain guide, amateur naturalist, chalet owner, and photographer
Ed Manfield (1943-1999), American bridge player, father to Seth
Harry Manfield (1855-1925), British politician, M.P.
James Mansfield (originally, Manfield, 1733-1821), British lawyer, judge, and politician
Leslie Manfield (1915-2006), Welsh rugby player
Matthew Manfield, Australian rules football player
Sir Philip Manfield, shoe manufacturer and MP

Seth Manfield (b. 1991), American Magic: the Gathering player, son of Ed

Places
Manfeild Autocourse
Manfield Village, Connecticut
Manfield Middle School, in Connecticut
Manfield Timberview High School

Other uses
Manfield Non-Life Master Pairs, bridge competition
Genro Manfield, character in The Alternate Asimovs

See also
 Mansfeld (disambiguation)
 Mansfield (disambiguation)